Sol is the second studio album by American electronic musician Eskmo. It was released in March 2015 under Apollo Records.

Track listing

References

2015 albums
Electronic albums by American artists